Noufissa Benchehida (born 23 October 1975) is a French Moroccan  actress.

Biography 
Benchehida was born in Morocco in 1975 in Oujda. She developed a passion for cinema in her childhood. She studied at the Cours Florent in Paris. Benchehida earned a diploma in dramatic arts at the Conservatory of Casablanca. She also attended Ecole supérieure d’hôtellerie et de tourisme à Montpellier.

Benchehida made her film debut in 2004, in Syriana directed by Stephane Cagan. She rose to fame playing the police officer Zineb Hejjami in the TV series El kadia in 2006. She stated she enjoyed the role but did not want to become typecast playing police officers, and wanted to appear in action films. Also in 2006, she was in the Syrian TV series Moulouk Attawaif. In 2011, Benchehida has a principal role as a woman who campaigned on behalf of exploited women in Agadir Bombay, directed by Myriam Bakir. In 2015, she starred in the film Aida.

In 2016, Benchehida starred in A la recherche du pouvoir perdu ("In Search of Lost Power"), directed by Mohammed Ahed Bensouda. She portrayed Ilham, a cabaret singer who gets involved with a retired general. Her performance caused her to receive the Golden Sotigui at the 2017 Sotigui Awards. Benchehida was also awarded Best Actress honors at the Panafrican Film and Television Festival of Ouagadougou.

Benchehida speaks French, Arabic, and English.

Filmography
2004 : Syriana
2006 : El kadia (TV series)
2006 : Moulouk Attawaif (TV series)
2009 : Elle
2010 : Scars (short film)
2010 : Une heure en enfer (TV series)
2011 : Agadir Bombay 
2013 : Beb El Fella - Le Cinemonde 
2013 : Appel Forcé
2015 : Aida
2016 : Massafat Mile Bihidayi 
2016 : A la recherche du pouvoir perdu
2018 : Wala alik (TV series)
2020 : Alopsy (short film)

References

External links
Noufissa Benchehida at the Internet Movie Database

1975 births
Living people
21st-century Moroccan actresses
Moroccan television actresses
Moroccan film actresses